Samarth Seth (born 14 September 1999) is an Indian cricketer.

Early life
Seth represented Delhi in the Under-16 and Under-19 level. He also represented Delhi in the Under-14 level as a medium pacer.

Career
Seth made his List A debut for Arunachal Pradesh in the 2018–19 Vijay Hazare Trophy on 19 September 2018, scoring a century. He was the leading run-scorer for Arunachal Pradesh in the 2018–19 Vijay Hazare Trophy, with 345 runs in seven matches. He made his first-class debut for Arunachal Pradesh in the 20 lo18–19 Ranji Trophy on 1 November 2018. He made his Twenty20 debut for Arunachal Pradesh in the 2018–19 Syed Mushtaq Ali Trophy on 21 February 2019.

In 2021, Seth played for the Barnard Castle Cricket Club in England.yes that is good player

References

External links
 

1999 births
Living people
Indian cricketers
Arunachal Pradesh cricketers
Place of birth missing (living people)